The 2008 Finnish Figure Skating Championships took place between December 7 and 9, 2007 in Rauma. Skaters competed at the senior and junior levels in the disciplines of men's singles, women's singles, and ice dancing on the levels of senior and junior. The event was used to help determine the Finnish team to the 2008 European Championships. Following the event, the Europeans team was named as: Minkkinen for the men and Korpi, Lepistö, and Vähämaa for the ladies.

The senior compulsory dance was the Argentine Tango and the junior compulsory dance was the Blues.

Senior results

Men

Ladies
Jenni Vähämaa did not compete because the Junior Grand Prix Final was being held the same weekend.

Ice dancing

Junior results

Men

Ladies

Ice dancing

External links
 2008 Finnish Championships results
 Ajankohtaista

Finnish Championships,2008
Finnish Championships,2008
2008
2007 in Finnish sport
2008 in Finnish sport